Eye of the Leopard (foaled March 2, 2006, in Ontario) is a Canadian thoroughbred racehorse who, on June 21, 2009, won Canada's most prestigious race, the Queen's Plate.

Called a "big goof" by his trainer, Eye of the Leopard was a late developer and did not race at age two. In early 2009, he suffered from a respiratory infection that further hampered his development.  He made his first start in April 2009 at Keeneland Race Course in Lexington, Kentucky, finishing third to last. He was then sent to his homebase at Woodbine Racetrack in Toronto, where he won his first race on May 10. He followed up with a win in the May 31 Plate Trial Stakes before capturing the 150th running of the Queen's Plate.

On July 12, 2009, the colt finished 3rd in the 74th Prince of Wales Stakes. Drawing chute 5, he rallied to finish third behind Gallant and Milwaukee Appeal.

References

External links 
 Eye of the Leopard's pedigree and partial racing stats
 Eye of the Leopard and the 2009 Plate Trial Stakes at the NTRA
 Video at YouTube of Eye of the Leopard winning the 2009 Queen's Plate

2006 racehorse births
Racehorses bred in Canada
Racehorses trained in Canada
King's Plate winners
Thoroughbred family 2-h